Saccharopolyspora gloriosae is a bacterium from the genus Saccharopolyspora which has been isolated from the stem of the plant Gloriosa superba from the tropical rainforest in Xishuangbanna in China.

References

 

Pseudonocardineae
Bacteria described in 2010